Armillaria singula is a species of agaric fungus in the family Physalacriaceae. It is found in Asia.

References

See also 
 List of Armillaria species

singula
Fungi described in 1994
Fungi of Asia
Fungal tree pathogens and diseases